Feit is a German-language surname. Notable people with the surname include:
 Carl Feit, Jewish American cancer research scientist
 Peter Feit (1883–1968), Thai music composer and professor
 Rosemary Feit Covey (born 1954), American printmaker
 Walter Feit (1930–2004), Jewish Austrian-American mathematician

See also 
 Feit–Thompson (disambiguation)

Related names 
 Feith (disambiguation)
 Veith, Veit (disambiguation), Veidt
 , Feitl, etc.

References 

German-language surnames
Jewish surnames